Draconibacterium mangrovi is a Gram-negative and facultatively anaerobic bacterium from the genus of Draconibacterium which has been isolated from mangrove sedimens from the Luoyang River in China.

References

Bacteroidia
Bacteria described in 2020